Avok is an Oceanic language spoken in South Malakula, Vanuatu.

References

Malekula languages
Languages of Vanuatu